Devgad is a taluka in Sindhudurg district of Maharashtra India consisting of 98 villages. It is located on the Arabian Sea in the coastal Konkan region of Maharashtra, south of Mumbai. Devgad is known globally for its exports of locally grown Alphonso mangoes.

Devgad is a natural harbour. However, only small vessels can enter the harbour.

History
It is noted for its harbour, its beach, and a lighthouse built in 1915 at the Devgad fort. Shilahara dynasty Raja Bhoja II constructed Fort Vijaydurg (Gheria), ruled later by Adil Shah and eventually by Chhatrapati Shivaji Maharaj and lastly Kanhoji Angre is a national monument situated 45 minutes by road from the main city of Devgad. Fort Vijaydurg, named as the "Eastern Gibraltar" because of its virtual impregnability, was impressive as seen by British, Dutch, Portuguese armies and travellers 400 years ago and even today as seen by visitors.

Transportation
The nearest railway station is Kankavli on Konkan Railway on Mumbai-Goa road. From Kankavli, one can get an auto-rickshaw or a  state transport bus to reach Devgad-Vijaydurg.

There is a wall under the sea at shores of the Vijaydurg built such that an enemy's ships, trying to attack, would crash and sink.

Trade
Devgad is also widely known for its pure Alphonso mango cultivation/farming and the whole development has evolved due to undertaking of the cultivation of Alphonso mango farming. Mangoes grown here are characterized by their distinct aroma, smooth exterior, thin skin and thick saffron pulp. The variety is different from the Alphonso mangoes grown in the Ratnagiri district. Such is the popularity of the Devgad Alphonso mango that vendors often pass off other similar looking mangoes under the name of Devgad Alphonso. 
Devgad Alphonso mango is grown on an area of 45,000 acres and reaches a production of about 50,000 tons in a year of decent production. Devgad is also home to the oldest and biggest co-operative society of mango farmers in India, called the Devgad Taluka Amba Utpadak Sahakari Sanstha Maryadit or Devgad Taluka Mango Growers Society Ltd with over 700 alphonso growers and 25-year-old in 2013.

Fishing is carried out on a large scale in the sea as well as in the creeks throughout the taluka region. The staple diet of this region is rice and fish.

The first windmill project in Maharashtra was installed at Girye.

Climate

Places to visit
Devgad is slowly becoming a tourist hot spot for tourists who want to avoid Goa beaches. This is perfect for family outing in a peaceful and calm backdrop.
 Kunkeshwar shiva temple- There is a temple of Hindu deity Shiva which was built in 11th century situated in Kunkeshwar town, 16 Km from main city of Devgad. It is very famous for its Divinity and religious values across Maharashtra and people gather from across Maharashtra on the occasion of Mahashivratri.  
 Shri Dev Rameshwar Temple- This is a 16th-century temple called as Shri Dev Rameshwar Temple, dedicated to lord shiva located at Rameshwar.
 Bhagwati Devi temple- There is a temple dedicated to the goddess Devi Bhagwati at the village of Munge.  
 Vishweswarayya and Swami Kartikaswamy temple- There are temples to God Vishweswarayya and Swami Kartikaswamy at Hindale village. 
 Rahateshwar temple- The temple of Shri Rahateshwar is in the village of Gadi Tamhane. 
Dirba Devi temple- A small village known as Jamsande is situated near to Devgad. The famous Dirba Devi goddess temple is located in jamsande. It is approximately 4 km from the Devgad bus stand. There is a small fair during Tripuri pourninam
Devgad Lighthouse-The western coastline is highly sensitive, hence recently, Government of India installed static radar and electro-optic sensors at Devgad Lighthouse as a part of India's first coastal surveillance network. Devgad is one out of 46 locations chosen for the network and envisages real-time surveillance cover up to 25 nautical miles.
 Devgad Fort- This is situated 3 km from bus stand, on the east of the town. The Ganesh mandir and tree old cannons are worth visiting. This fort is situated on a small hillock close to the sea. Panoramic view of sea and the sunset view is best seen from the fort. 
 Devgad Beach- It is about 2 km from the Devgad bus stand.

Demography
The following is a list of villages and their populations according to 2011 Census data:

References

Cities and towns in Sindhudurg district
Talukas in Maharashtra
Talukas in Sindhudurg district